In geometry, the rhombicosacron (or midly dipteral ditriacontahedron) is a nonconvex isohedral polyhedron. It is the dual of the uniform rhombicosahedron, U56. It has 50 vertices, 120 edges, and 60 crossed-quadrilateral faces.

Proportions
The dihedral angle equals . The ratio between the lengths of the long edges and the short ones equals , which is the square of the golden ratio.

References

External links 
 
 Uniform polyhedra and duals

Dual uniform polyhedra